Hysland Aliaj (born 5 April 1991) is an Albanian retired footballer who played as a defender.

References

1991 births
Living people
Albanian footballers
People from Mallakastër
Association football defenders
KF Apolonia Fier players
KS Albpetrol Patos players
KF Bylis Ballsh players
Kategoria Superiore players
Kategoria e Parë players
Kategoria e Dytë players